Thomas Patrick Benedict O'Brien (13 April 1904 – 3 March 1983) was a former Australian rules footballer who played with Melbourne in the Victorian Football League (VFL).

Notes

External links 

1904 births
Australian rules footballers from Victoria (Australia)
Melbourne Football Club players
1983 deaths